In Safe Hands is a 2018 French drama film directed by Jeanne Herry starring her mother Miou-Miou.

Cast
 Sandrine Kiberlain : Karine
 Gilles Lellouche : Jean
 Élodie Bouchez : Alice
 Olivia Côte : Lydie
 Clotilde Mollet : Mathilde
 Miou-Miou : Irène
 Stéfi Celma : Elodie
 Jean-François Stévenin : Alice's father
 Bruno Podalydès : Alice's ex
 Grégory Gadebois : PFS Head of Service
 Émilie Gavois-Kahn : The pediatric nurse

References

External links
 

2018 drama films
French drama films
2010s French-language films
Films about adoption
2010s French films